Jan Westdorp (born 6 September 1934) is a Dutch racing cyclist. He rode in the 1961 Tour de France.

References

1934 births
Living people
Dutch male cyclists
Place of birth missing (living people)